Coleophora chambersella is a moth of the family Coleophoridae. It is found in the United States, including Colorado.

References

chambersella
Moths described in 1903
Moths of North America